Mümmelmannsberg is a place and major housing estate in Hamburg, Germany in the quarter of Billstedt. It was named after the street with the same name which already existed before Mümmelmannsberg was built.

Geography
Mümmelmannsberg is located in the east of Billstedt which is a part of the borough Mitte. It borders Hamburg-Lohbrügge and Oststeinbek in Schleswig-Holstein. The postal code is 22115.

History
The housing complex was built between 1970 and 1979. Today Mümmelmannsberg is also called “Mümmelberg", "M-Town", "Mümmeltown" or most commonly "Mümmel".

Since 1990 Mümmelmannsberg has a U-Bahn station with the same name.

In April 2006 Mümmelmannsberg got nationwide recognition for a ZDF documentary. The German TV channel paid teenagers for recreating violent scenes about attacks and burglary. This was supposed to teach the audience about ghettos in cities. This incident got a big backlash for criminalizing innocent teenagers in Mümmemannsberg because of fictive acts. The place's image got worse and millennials complained about finding a job harder after the documentary was aired.

The foreign population is about 23% (the entire district about 47%) and an above-average number of welfare recipients lives in Mümmelmannsberg.

References

Zones of Hamburg
Buildings and structures in Hamburg-Mitte
Housing estates in Germany